"Anyway" is a song by American singer Chris Brown from his seventh studio album Royalty. It was released as an instant grat track on December 11, 2015. It was produced by BLAQTUXEDO and features a guest appearance by Tayla Parx. The song peaked at number 7 on the US Bubbling Under Hot 100 Singles.

Music video
On December 16, 2015, Brown uploaded the music video for "Anyway" on his YouTube and Vevo account.

Charts

References

2015 songs
Chris Brown songs
Songs written by Chris Brown
Songs written by Tayla Parx